25 meter standard pistol is one of the ISSF shooting events, introduced at the ISSF World Shooting Championships in 1970. It has its roots in the conventional pistol competitions developed by the National Rifle Association of America.

The standard pistol match is shot with a regular sport pistol (also called a standard pistol) in caliber .22 LR. As with all ISSF pistol disciplines, all firing must be done with one hand, unsupported.

The 60-shot match is divided into 5-shot strings with different timings:

 4 strings within 150 seconds each – competitor can begin the series in any fashion he/she chooses.
 4 strings within 20 seconds each – competitor must begin each string with pistol in one outstretched arm from the 45-degree angle starting position.
 4 strings within 10 seconds each – competitor must begin each string with pistol in one outstretched arm from the 45-degree angle starting position.

Just like 25 meter center-fire pistol, standard pistol is a non-Olympic event and so gains little attention. It is one of the few events where targets did not change in 1989, so no resetting of records has been made. As a result, many records are rather old.

World Championships, Men

World Championships, Men Junior

World Championships, Men Team

World Championships, total medals

Current World Records

World champions

ISSF shooting events
Handgun shooting sports